Ganson Purcell served as chairman of the U.S. Securities and Exchange Commission between 1942 and 1946 and also served as a member from 1941 to 1946. He graduated from Williams College in 1927.

Members of the U.S. Securities and Exchange Commission
Williams College alumni
Franklin D. Roosevelt administration personnel
Truman administration personnel
Year of birth missing
Year of death missing